Nahal Barak, also known as Barak gorge or Barak river, is an intermittent stream and canyon in the Arava desert in Israel's South District. When it is flooded, Nahal Barak forms part of the network of streams that drain the Negev desert. The stream itself is 18 km long and flows in a general easterly direction into the Nahal HaArava, which in turn flows northward into the southernmost end of the Dead Sea. The stream cuts through limestone to form the gorge, which is known as White Canyon. There are several options of hiking at the Barak gorge including a tour.

References

Rivers of Israel